This article gives an overview of liberalism in Montenegro.

History
Following the fall of communist regime, one of the first parties to emerge was Liberal Alliance (LSCG), a party which advocated liberalism, pacifism, civic concept of the state and supported restoration of Montenegrin independence. It was an active opponent of the ruling DPS-led regime since its formation, all until 2005, when it froze its political activity. Slavko Perović and Miro Vicković were the most prominent officials and held the leading positions in the party throughout its existence. In 2004, nationalist Liberal Party (LP) split from the LSCG, its membership including a number of former high-ranking LSCG officials who were previously ousted from the party due to corruption affair. Despite attempting to adopt the legacy of LSCG, LP pursued an entirely different discourse, and has closely cooperated with ruling DPS since its foundation. Since 2016 election, its integrated into the electoral lists of DPS, which ran independently.

Liberal political parties in Montenegro

Active:
United Reform Action 
Civis 
Democrats 
Demos 
Liberal Party 
Montenegrin 

Historically:
Union of Reform Forces 
Liberal Alliance 
Civic Party 
Movement for Changes 
Democratic Centre 
Positive Montenegro

See also
 History of Montenegro
 Politics of Montenegro
 List of political parties in Montenegro

References

 
Montenegro
Politics of Montenegro